Alpina is a bicycle parts brand that manufactures handlebars, cranksets, chainrings, wheels and other components for track and road bikes.  It was founded by Terry Dolan of Dolan Bikes.  

Alpina bars have been used by many British Olympic winning medallists on the track including Sir Chris Hoy, Victoria Pendleton, Katie Archibald and Laura Kenny.

References

External links

Cycle parts manufacturers